In molecular biology, glycoside hydrolase family 47 is a family of glycoside hydrolases.

Glycoside hydrolases  are a widespread group of enzymes that hydrolyse the glycosidic bond between two or more carbohydrates, or between a carbohydrate and a non-carbohydrate moiety. A classification system for glycoside hydrolases, based on sequence similarity, has led to the definition of >100 different families. This classification is available on the CAZy web site, and also discussed at CAZypedia, an online encyclopedia of carbohydrate active enzymes.

Glycoside hydrolase family 47 CAZY GH_47 comprises enzymes with only one known activity; alpha-mannosidase.

Alpha-mannosidase is involved in the maturation of Asn-linked oligosaccharides. The enzyme hydrolyses terminal 1,2-linked alpha-D-mannose residues in the oligo-mannose oligosaccharide man(9)(glcnac)(2) in a calcium-dependent manner. The mannose residues are trimmed away to produce, first, man(8)glcnac(2), then a man(5)(glcnac)(2) structure.

References 

EC 3.2.1
GH family
Protein families